Ennai Pol Oruvan is a 1978 Indian Tamil-language film, directed by T. R. Ramanna. The film stars Sivaji Ganesan, Sarada and Ushanandini. It was released on 18 March 1978, and performed poorly at the box office.

Plot

Cast 
Sivaji Ganesan as Sekar and Sundaramoorthy
Sarada as Lakshmi
Ushanandini as Usha
R. S. Manohar as Sabapathy
M. R. R. Vasu  as Namachivayam
S. V. Ramadas as Velu
Suruli Rajan as Usha's father
Haalam as Vimala
V. Nagayya as Sundaramoorthy's father
Kumari Rukmani as Sekar's mother
Sasikumar as Usha's brother
Usharani as Sundaramoorthy's sister
Master Giri as Mohan
Baby Sumathi as Shanthi
Ennathe Kannaiah as Aasari Arulprakasam
Typist Gopu as Aadiyapatham
Senji Krishnan as Soosai
S. R. Prabhakar as the psychology doctor
Comedy Shanmugam as Shanmugam
Pushpamala as Alamel

Production 
Ennai Pol Oruvan finished production in the mid-1970s, but released only in 1978.

Soundtrack 
The music was composed by M. S. Viswanathan. The song "Velaale Vizhikal" is in Madhyamavati raga.

References

External links 
 

1970s Tamil-language films
1978 films
Films directed by T. R. Ramanna
Films scored by M. S. Viswanathan